Artel may refer to:

 Artel, various cooperative associations that existed in the Russian Empire and the Soviet Union
 ARTĚL, Bohemian glass company
 Artel Electronics, an Uzbek company

 Persons
 Artel Great (b. 1981), American actor and filmmaker
 Rael Artel (b. 1980), Ectonian art writer, curator and gallerist

See also 
 Artel Staratelei "Amur" Airlines
 Artell